Mark Cubbon may refer to:

 Mark Cubbon (army officer), British army officer with the East India Company
 Mark Cubbon (administrator), chief executive of the Manchester University NHS Foundation Trust

See also 
 Mark Cuban, American investor and entrepreneur